The 2005–06 season was JS Kabylie's 41st season in the Algerian top flight. They competed in National 1, the Algerian Cup and the Champions League.

Squad list
Players and squad numbers last updated on 25 September 2005.Note: Flags indicate national team as has been defined under FIFA eligibility rules. Players may hold more than one non-FIFA nationality.

Competitions

Overview

{| class="wikitable" style="text-align: center"
|-
!rowspan=2|Competition
!colspan=8|Record
!rowspan=2|Started round
!rowspan=2|Final position / round
!rowspan=2|First match	
!rowspan=2|Last match
|-
!
!
!
!
!
!
!
!
|-
| National 1

|  
| style="background:gold;"| Champion
| 25 August 2005
| 25 May 2006
|-
| Algerian Cup

| Round of 64 
| Semi-finals
| 29 December 2005
| 2 June 2006
|-
| 2006 Champions League

| Preliminary round
| Second round
| 19 February 2006
| 30 April 2006
|-
! Total

National 1

League table

Results summary

Results by round

Matches

Algerian Cup

Champions League

Preliminary round

First round

Second round

Squad information

Playing statistics

|-

|-
! colspan=12 style=background:#dcdcdc; text-align:center| Players transferred out during the season

Goalscorers
Includes all competitive matches. The list is sorted alphabetically by surname when total goals are equal.

Transfers

In

Out

References

JS Kabylie seasons
JS Kabylie